Benjamin or Ben Rogers may refer to:

 Benjamin Rogers (musician) (1614–1698), English organist and composer
 Benjamin Rogers (politician, born 1836) (1836–1911), merchant and politician in Prince Edward Island
 Benjamin Rogers (politician, born 1837) (1837–1923), former Lieutenant Governor of Prince Edward Island
 Benjamin Bickley Rogers (1828–1919), English classical scholar
 Benjamin Tingley Rogers (1865–1918), founder of the BC Sugar Refining Company
 Ben Rogers (archer) (born 1947), American archer on the men's gold medal team in the 2014 World Field Archery Championships
 Ben Rogers (rugby league) (born 1985), Australian rugby league player
 Benedict Rogers, British human rights activist
 Ben Rogers (Days of Our Lives), a character from the American soap opera Days of Our Lives